Richland, Indiana is the name of two places in Indiana.

Richland City, Indiana, a town in Spencer County
Richland, Rush County, Indiana, an unincorporated community